The ambassador of the United Kingdom to Indonesia is the United Kingdom's foremost diplomatic representative in the Republic of Indonesia, and in charge of the UK's diplomatic mission.  The official title is His Britannic Majesty's Ambassador to the Republic of Indonesia.

The British Ambassador to Indonesia is also accredited to the Democratic Republic of Timor-Leste.

Ambassadors to Indonesia 
1950–1953: Sir Derwent Kermode
1953–1956: Sir Oscar Morland
1956–1959: Dermot MacDermot
1959–1963: Sir Leslie Fry
1963–1966: Andrew Gilchrist
1966–1968: Horace Phillips
1968–1970: Henry Hainworth
1970–1975: Sir Willis Combs
1975–1978: Sir John Ford
1978–1981: Terence O'Brien
1982–1984: Robert Brash
1984–1988: Sir Alan Donald
1988–1990: William White
1990–1994: Roger Carrick
1994–1997: Graham Burton
1997–2000: Robin Christopher
2000–2004: Richard Gozney
2004–2008: Charles Humfrey
2008–2011: Martin Hatfull
2011–2014: Mark Canning
2014: Rebecca Razavi (acting)

2014–2019: Moazzam Malik
2019–: Owen Jenkins

References

External links
UK and Indonesia, gov.uk

Indonesia
 
United Kingdom